Christophe Louis Yves Georges Pierre (born 30 January 1946) is a French prelate of the Catholic Church. He is an archbishop who has been serving as the apostolic nuncio (ambassador) to the United States since 2016.  Pierre previously served as apostolic nuncio to Mexico, Uganda and Haiti.

Biography

Early life 
Christophe Pierre was born in Rennes, France, on 30 January 1946 to a family with roots for many generations in Brittany. He first attended school at Antsirabe in Madagascar and pursued his secondary studies at the College of Saint-Malo. He also spent one year in Morocco at Lycée Français of Marrakesh.

He entered the Catholic seminary of Saint-Yves in Rennes in 1963, but interrupted his studies for two years of military service in France in 1965 and 1966.

Priesthood 
Pierre was ordained a priest of the Archdiocese of Rennes at the Cathedral of Saint-Malo in Saint-Malo, France, on 5 April 1970.  He served as vicar of the parish of Saint-Pierre-Saint-Paul de Colombes in the Diocese of Nanterre from 1970 to 1973. Pierre obtained his Master of Theology degree at the Institut Catholique de Paris and his Doctor of Canon Law degree from the Pontifical Lateran University in Rome (1973-1977).

Diplomatic service 
Pierre then earned a diploma at the Pontifical Ecclesiastical Academy in Rome, the Vatican school for diplomacy. He entered the Vatican diplomatic service in 1977, serving first in Wellington, New Zealand. Pierre then held posts in Mozambique, Zimbabwe, Cuba, Brazil, and at the Permanent Observer of the Holy See to the United Nations in Geneva.

Haiti 
On 12 July 1995, Pope John Paul II named Pierre as apostolic nuncio to Haiti and titular archbishop of Gunela. He was consecrated archbishop by Cardinal Secretary of State Angelo Sodano on 24 September in the Cathedral of Saint-Malo. In Haiti, which had experienced years of church-state conflict, Pierre was described as non-political.  He arranged for Haitian President Jean-Bertrand Aristide to be released from his vows as a Catholic priest.

Uganda 
On 10 May 1999, Pierre was transferred as apostolic nuncio to Kampala, Uganda. In 2000, he campaigned against the Ugandan government's promotion of condom use to prevent the spread of HIV/AIDS. Vice President Speciosa Kazibwe, herself a doctor, promoted condom use during a national tour and complained that religious leaders were hampering the government's public health efforts.  Pierre replied that condoms promoted "outright promiscuity" that would increase the incidence of HIV/AIDS. Years later, Pierre linked Uganda's success in fighting HIV/AIDS to the church's abstinence education strategy. During his time in Uganda, Pierrre worked with Italian missionary Father John Scalabrini in supporting many disadvantaged Ugandans with school and health care.

Mexico 
On 22 March 2007, Pope Benedict XVI named Pierre as apostolic nuncio to Mexico. After Pope Francis sharply criticized the Mexican bishops during his visit to Mexico in February 2016, an editorial in the newspaper of the Archdiocese of Mexico City objected to the Pope's criticism and asked: "Does the Pope have some reason for scolding Mexican bishops? ... [Do] the improvised words of the Holy Father respond to bad advice from someone close to him? Who gave the Pope bad advice?" Pierre was generally recognized as the target of the editorial and the source of the "bad advice".

Jorge E. Traslosheros wrote in Crux that, while in Mexico, Pierre managed "to weave with an artist's skills unity among Catholics, thereby overcoming the political divisions and culture wars that have caused so much damage".  Traslosheros credited Pierre with bridging Mexico's secular establishment and the Catholic populace.

United States 
Pope Francis named Pierre as apostolic nuncio to the United States on 12 April 2016. Advocating for immigrants, he joined demonstrations and meetings with Texas-Mexico border bishops in October 2016 in Nogales, Arizona, and in February 2016 in San Juan, Puerto Rico. Pierre celebrated Mass at the National Scout Jamboree in July 2017 and discussed his five years in Scouting in a sermon that tied Scouting's ideals to Christian service.

See also
 List of heads of the diplomatic missions of the Holy See

References

External links

Catholic Hierarchy

Living people
1946 births
Apostolic Nuncios to Haiti
Apostolic Nuncios to Mexico
Apostolic Nuncios to Uganda
Apostolic Nuncios to the United States
Roman Catholic titular archbishops
Institut Catholique de Paris alumni
Pontifical Ecclesiastical Academy alumni
Pontifical Lateran University alumni